The Faroe Islands national under-21 football team are a feeder team to the Faroe Islands national football team. The Faroe Islands U21 team was first formed in 2006 and took part in UEFA European Under-21 Championship qualifying for the first time in 2007 and 2008. Before this there was no step between the U-19 team and the senior team.

History 

In 2006, it was announced that the Faroe Islands will have an under-21 team and will take part in qualification for the UEFA European Under-21 Football Championship. From then on the Faroe Islands are now represented in all age groups, U-15, U-17, U-19 and U-21 also.
In early 2007 the Faroese Football Association appointed two coaches, Heðin Askham and Bill McLeod Jacobsen, both have been coaches for several other Faroese youth national teams. A squad of 34 players was selected for the first training season.
A 20-man squad was named for the first two matches against Croatia and Albania in the 2009 UEFA Under-21 Championship qualifying. Faroe Islands lost the first match 2-0, with Croatia scoring their second goal in the last minute. They lost the second match 1-0, Albania scored the only goal of the match in the second half from a penalty kick.
Faroe Islands had to wait until their fourth match for the first under-21 victory, it came when they beat Azerbaijan 1-0 in Toftir. Their only other point was also against Azerbaijan, in the away match. Faroe Islands finished the group in 5th place, 1 point above Azerbaijan.

In the 2011 UEFA Under-21 Championship qualifying, on 9 June 2009 Faroe Islands under-21 recorded a famous victory over Russia U21, beating them 1-0 after a goal in the first minute. This was followed by a 1-1 draw against Moldova in September, but Faroe Islands lost the next match 3-1 against Latvia. Russia had their revenge in the away match and defeated Faroe Islands 2-0. They also lost both matches against Romania. In November 2009 Faroe Islands beat Latvia 1-0 and were held to a 1-1 draw against Andorra. Faroe Islands won the home match against Andorra 3-1. Faroe Islands had the chance of finishing third in the group going into the final match against Moldova, in Tiraspol. The score remained 0-0 until Moldova scored a goal with 10 minutes left to play and the Faroe Islands had a player sent off minutes later.

Faroe Islands U21 began the 2013 UEFA Under-21 Championship qualifying with two matches against Northern Ireland. In the first match, with the score at 0-0, the Faroe Islands were awarded a penalty just before injury-time in the second-half. Captain Rógvi Holm missed the spotkick and the chance to give the team victory.
In the away match against Northern Ireland, Faroe Islands lost 4-0. This was followed by away defeats to Serbia, Macedonia, and Denmark. The next matches were verses Macedonia and Serbia in June 2012 and were the first matches at home in just over a year for the team. Faroe Islands drew 1-1 with Macedonia, ending a run of four straight defeats, but lost the other match 2-0 to Serbia. The final match of the group for the Faroe Islands was against Denmark, in which the Faroe Islands secured a 1-1 draw after scoring a late equaliser.

In October 2014, the Faroese Football Association (FSF) announced that Heðin Askham did not wish to continue as the coach for the Faroe Islands U21 in 2015, instead he was the new head coach for HB Tórshavn. In January 2015 FSF announced that they had decided to promote the former assisting coach Bill McLeod Jacobsen to be head coach for the team. On 14 January 2015 FSF announced that Eli Hentze was the new assisting coach.

Results

2011 UEFA European Under-21 Championship qualification

2013 UEFA European Under-21 Championship qualification

2015 UEFA European Under-21 Championship qualification

2017 UEFA European Under-21 Championship qualification

2019 UEFA European Under-21 Championship qualification

2021 UEFA European Under-21 Championship qualification

2023 UEFA European Under-21 Championship qualification

Current squad
 The following players were called up for the 2023 UEFA European Under-21 Championship qualification matches.
 Match dates: 1 and 7 June 2022
 Opposition:  and Caps and goals correct as of:''' 29 March 2022, after the match against .

|-----
! colspan="9" bgcolor="#B0D3FB" align="left" |
|----- bgcolor="#DFEDFD"

|-----
! colspan="9" bgcolor="#B0D3FB" align="left" |
|----- bgcolor="#DFEDFD"

|-----
! colspan="9" bgcolor="#B0D3FB" align="left" |
|----- bgcolor="#DFEDFD"

References

European national under-21 association football teams
Faroe Islands national football team